The Naval Service is the maritime component of the Irish Defence Forces. It was initially formed in 1923, as the Coastal and Marine Service (CMS), a small organisation manned mainly by personnel who had come from the merchant navy. The CMS was disbanded in 1924 and, until 1938, a limited fisheries protection function was operated under the Department of Agriculture and Fisheries. The Marine and Coastwatching Service was established in 1939, and operated as a mine laying, shipping regulation and fishery protection throughout the period of Ireland's neutrality during World War II. In 1946, the Marine Service was integrated with the land and air elements of the Defence Forces, forming the genesis of the modern Naval Service.

1922–1938 

The Anglo-Irish treaty of 1922 stipulated that Ireland would be given responsibility to police its customs and fishing, while the United Kingdom would remain in control of Irish waters.
In 1923, The Irish Coastal and Marine Service was created, but was disbanded one year later. The CMS ship Muirchú continued patrol of Irish fisheries. Muirchu was later armed in 1936.
In 1938 the United Kingdom handed over three treaty ports (Cork Harbour, Bere Haven and Lough Swilly). Consequently, the Royal Navy withdrew from Cork Harbour in July 1938. The Fort Rannoch was added to the Irish fleet at that time.

1939–1945 

In 1939 the Irish Government ordered two Motor Torpedo Boats (60ft) from British builder Vosper Thorneycroft. When World War II began in September 1939 the Marine and Coastwatching Service was set up. In order for Ireland to remain neutral, it became clear that a full naval service would be required. 

In June 1940, an Irish Marine and Coastwatching Service Motor Torpedo Boat (MTB) made two separate trips to rescue British and French soldiers during the Dunkirk evacuation. The government subsequently ordered an additional 4 MTBs. By the end of 1940 the Irish Marine and Coastwatching Service consisted of 2 MTBs and 4 other assorted craft.

During the Emergency (WWII), the Service regulated merchant ships, protected fisheries, and laid mines in Cork and Waterford. In 1942, two more MTB's arrived and the Service was renamed to the "Irish Marine Service".
The last MTB arrived in 1943.

1946–1971 
In September 1946, the Marine Service was incorporated into the Irish Defence Forces. This was the beginning of the modern Naval Service. The navy purchased three Flower-Class corvettes from the United Kingdom in 1946 and 1947. The tradition of naming Irish Naval Ships after figures in Celtic Mythology was started, and the ships were named Cliona, Maev and Macha. These three ships were to become a key part of the Naval Service in the 1950s and 1960s.
The first formal training of Irish Naval Cadets took place at the Britannia Royal Naval College, Dartmouth, UK in 1947. Between 1968 and 1970, Cliona, Maev and Macha were withdrawn from service. These were replaced by three minesweepers commissioned in 1971: Gráinne, Banba and Fola.

1972–1996 
In 1971 the Naval Service commissioned Verolme Cork Dockyard to build an offshore patrol ship. Named LÉ Deirdre, it was the first naval vessel purpose-built in Ireland to patrol its waters.
The Economic Exclusion Zone of Ireland was increased in 1976 from 12 to 200 miles (22.2 to 370.4 km). The subsequent strain put on the Naval Service prompted funding from the European Community to build and purchase seven ships. Several of these remained in use into the 21st century, apart from LÉ Setanta, which was sold in 1984.

1996–2001 

The 50th anniversary of the Irish Naval Service took place in 1996. Celebrations included a fleet review by president Mary Robinson. In 1999, a new ship LÉ Róisin was delivered to the Navy, marking the beginning of a new class of larger patrol vessels. This was followed up with the commissioning of LÉ Niamh in September 2001.

Further reading

References

Maritime history of Ireland
Naval Service